Elizabeth "Beth" Abruzese Mason (born October 20, 1960) is an American politician and member of the Democratic Party, who served as 2nd Ward Councilwoman and City Council President in Hoboken, New Jersey from 2007 until 2015.

Personal life

Mason grew up in a middle-class family in Richmond, Virginia with her parents Tom and Judy and her younger sister Terri. She is a graduate of Virginia Commonwealth University, where she became the first ever woman to serve as President of the Student Government at VCU.

Shortly after graduation, she moved to Hoboken in 1984, where she has lived ever since. At just 28 years old, Mason was named Vice President of a New York City advertising agency and then named President at age 31.

Over the years she has advised over 80 businesses, many of them Fortune 500 companies.  Some of her most notable clients are MCIWorldcom, Goldman Sachs, American Express, and the Taj Mahal. Beth also donated her expertise to the NY American Marketing Association. She is the co-founder of the AMA's Marketing Hall of Fame, the only award that honors brands, and won the association's coveted Gold Effie among other advertising industry awards.

She is married to Ricky Mason and together they have two daughters, Shipley and Virginia.

Political career 

Mason ran for Hoboken Mayor in 2009, finishing in third place.  The top two candidates Peter Cammarano and Dawn Zimmer faced off in a runoff election.   Mason endorsed Zimmer, but Cammarano  prevailed in a tight race winning  by just 161 votes.

After Cammarano was arrested by the FBI as part of a major corruption and international money laundering conspiracy probe known as Operation Bid Rig, Mason again faced Zimmer in the special election, along with five other opponents: businessman Frank Raia, former Hoboken Municipal Court Judge Kimberly Glatt, Hoboken Republican Club co-founder Nathan Brinkman, management consultant Everton A. Wilson, and former corrections officer Patricia Waiters. Zimmer won with 43% of the vote, while Mason finished in second place with 23%.

References

External links
 Mason for City Council Campaign Website
 Hoboken Official City Website

Living people
New Jersey Democrats
Politicians from Hoboken, New Jersey
1960 births
21st-century American politicians
21st-century American women politicians
Politicians from Richmond, Virginia
Virginia Commonwealth University alumni